Eastern Visayas (or Silangang Visayas) is an administrative region in the Philippines, designated as Region VIII. It consists of three main islands, Samar, Leyte and Biliran. The region has six provinces, one independent city and one highly urbanized city namely, Biliran, Leyte, Northern Samar, Samar, Eastern Samar, Southern Leyte, Ormoc and Tacloban. The highly urbanized city of Tacloban is the sole regional center. These provinces and cities occupy the easternmost islands of the Visayas group of islands.

Eastern Visayas faces the Philippine Sea to the east. The region's most famous landmark is the San Juanico Bridge, which links the provinces of Samar and Leyte. As of 2020, the Eastern Visayas region has a population of 4,547,150 inhabitants, making it the third most populous region in the Visayas.

Etymology
The current name of the region was derived from its location in the easternmost part of the Visayas.

Geography

Eastern Visayas lies on the east central section of the Philippine archipelago. It consists of three main islands, Leyte, Biliran and Samar, which form the easternmost coasts of the archipelago. It is bounded on the east and north by the Philippine Sea with the San Bernardino Strait separating Samar from southeastern Luzon; on the west by the Camotes and Visayan seas, and on the south by the Bohol Sea with the Surigao Strait separating Leyte from northwestern Mindanao.

Climate
There are two types of climate prevailing in the region under the Corona system of classification: Type II and Type IV. Type II climate is characterized by having no dry season but a pronounced maximum rainfall from November to January. Samar Island and the eastern part of Leyte Island fall under this type of climate. Type IV on the other hand has an even distribution of rainfall the year round and a short period of dry season that can be observed starting February up to May. This type of climate is well exhibited at the western half of Leyte island and some portion of Samar which covers the municipality of Motiong up to San Isidro of Northern Samar.

In November 2013, the region was struck with the highest death toll in the nation by Super Typhoon Haiyan, the second deadliest typhoon ever to violently hit the Philippines. Typhoons frequently hit the region along with the Bicol region as the most typhoon prone parts of the Philippines.

Natural resources
The region's sea and inland waters are rich sources of salt and fresh water fish and other marine products. It is one of the fish exporting regions of the country. There are substantial forest reserves in the interiors of the islands. Its mineral deposits include chromite, uranium (in Samar), gold, silver, manganese, magnesium, bronze, nickel, clay, coal, limestone, pyrite and sand and gravel. It has abundant geothermal energy and water resources to support the needs of medium and heavy industries.

Administrative divisions

Provinces

Eastern Visayas consists of 6 provinces, 1 highly urbanized city, 1 independent component city, 5 component cities, 136 municipalities and 4,390 barangays.

Governors and vice governors

Provinces

Demographics

Languages

The native languages of Eastern Visayas are:
 Abaknon, spoken in Capul Island in Northern Samar.
 Baybayanon, spoken in Baybay in Leyte.
 Boholano, spoken in Southern Leyte.
 Cebuano, spoken in parts of Biliran, Leyte, Southern Leyte, Samar, Northern Samar, and Eastern Samar.
 Kinabalian, spoken in the municipality of San Juan, Southern Leyte.
 Waray-Waray, spoken in Biliran, Leyte, Southern Leyte, Samar, Northern Samar, and Eastern Samar. It is the regional lingua franca.

Economy

Eastern Visayas is primarily an agricultural region with rice, corn, coconut, sugarcane and banana as its major crops.

Primary sources of revenue are manufacturing, wholesale and retail trade and services. Mining, farming, fishing and tourism contribute significantly to the economy. Manufacturing firms include mining companies, fertilizer plants, sugar central, rice and corn mills and other food processing plants. Tacloban is the hub of investment, trade and development in the region.

Other industries include coconut oil extraction, alcohol distilling, beverage manufacture and forest products. Home industries include hat and basket weaving, metal craft, needlecraft, pottery, ceramics, woodcraft, shell craft and bamboo craft.

Culture

Dances
Tinikling, the Philippines' national dance is folkdance that originated from the region. But the most popular cultural dance among Waraynons is the Kuratsa, danced during feast celebrations and special gatherings. The Leyte Kalipayan Dance Company, a local cultural group, held highly successful performances around the world.

Music
Waray people are music lovers whose folkloric music are mostly ballads in form, famous of which is Iroy nga Tuna (Motherland), a patriotic song.

Festivals
Since 2018, Eastern Visayas holds each October the 'Oktubafest' to showcase the best local wine made from coconut palm called tuba.

Infrastructure

Transportation
The region's Leyte and Samar islands serve as main link between Luzon and Mindanao by land transport. A total of nine airports, are strategically located in different parts of the six provinces that define the region. Daniel Z. Romualdez Airport in Tacloban is the main gateway by air to the region. There are seaports in Tacloban, Baybay, Catbalogan, Calbayog, Borongan, Allen, Ormoc, Bato, Hilongos, Maasin, Sogod, and Naval.

Power and energy
The region is the top producer of geothermal energy supply in the country. The province of Leyte hosts the biggest geothermal plant in the Philippines. Still, geothermal exploration is ongoing in the nearby province of Biliran. With abundance of river system, the region has potential in hydroelectric production. The strait of San Juanico between Leyte and Samar islands has been declared as potential source for water current and tidal energy sources.

Education
Eastern Visayas is home to several state universities, including the prestigious University of the Philippines Visayas Tacloban College. The region is also home to the University of Eastern Philippines (UEP), located in Catarman, Northern Samar, which holds the most number of baccalaureate and post-baccalaureate courses among universities in the region.

The Zonal Agricultural University for the Visayas under the National Agriculture Education System concept, Visayas State University (VSU) is also in the region, located in Baybay. Also, the region is home to Palompon Institute of Technology, a maritime school in the Philippines providing deck and engine cadet. Its main campus is located in the municipality of Palompon, Leyte province.

The Eastern Visayas State University is Leyte's state university with five extension campuses. Southern Leyte State University with five extension campuses, is the only state university in the province of Southern Leyte. In Biliran, Naval State University is the province state university. For Eastern Samar, the Eastern Samar State University is the only state university of the province with four extension campus while Samar State University is Samar's state university with two extension campuses. Northwest Samar State University serves Samar Province's first district. For teacher education, the Leyte Normal University specializes in education courses.

References

External links 
 
 
 

 
Regions of the Philippines
Visayas